In the 2004–05 season, Clyde competed in their fifth consecutive season in the Scottish First Division. Billy Reid, who was assistant manager the previous season, was given the manager's job, following the departure of Alan Kernaghan.

Transfers

May  – January

In:

Out:

January  – April

In:

Out:

Squad

Results

Scottish First Division

Scottish Challenge Cup

Scottish League Cup

Scottish Cup

Player statistics

League table

Notes

 

Clyde F.C. seasons
Clyde